Wiktor Dega (7 December 1896 – 16 February 1995) was a Polish surgeon. He was an orthopedist who was well known for his work on polio. He served as an expert for the World Health Organization. He created new apparatus and devices to help accident victims and survivors of polio, as well as new therapies and operations for congenital dislocations of the hip. He was born in the German Empire and served in the German Army during World War I.

1896 births
1995 deaths
Polish orthopaedic surgeons
20th-century surgeons
Recipients of the State Award Badge (Poland)
Member of the Tomasz Zan Society